Martz may refer to:

People 
Martz (surname), notable people with the surname
Martz Schmidt (1922–1998), Spanish comics writer and artist

Places 
Martz (crater), an impact crater on Mars
Martz Observatory, an organization devoted to the amateur astronomer
Martz Rock Shelters, an American archeological site in Pennsylvania

Other uses 
Martz Communications Group, an American radio broadcasting company
Martz Group, an American bus company

See also
Marz (disambiguation)